Madison Monroe "Buzz" Nutter (February 16, 1931 – April 12, 2008) was an American football center in the National Football League (NFL) for the Baltimore Colts and Pittsburgh Steelers.  He played college football at Virginia Tech.

Early life
Nutter was born in Summersville, West Virginia and grew up in Huntington, West Virginia, where he acquired the nickname "Buzz" as a young man.  He attended and played high school football at Vinson High School.

College career
Nutter attended and played college football at Virginia Tech.  After his senior season, he became the first player from Virginia Tech drafted into the NFL, despite the team going 0-10, 2-8 and 5-6 the final three seasons of his career.  Nutter was inducted into the Virginia Tech Sports Hall of Fame in 1985.

Professional career
Nutter was drafted in the 12th round of the 1953 NFL Draft by the Washington Redskins.  He failed to make the team in the offseason and moved back to West Virginia to work in a steel mill.  He returned to the NFL in 1954 with the Baltimore Colts, where he played for seven seasons and won consecutive NFL Championship titles (1958–1959).  Nutter was traded to the Pittsburgh Steelers, along with Eugene Lipscomb, in 1961 for wide receiver Jimmy Orr.  Nutter played in Pittsburgh for four seasons and was selected for the Pro Bowl in 1962.  In 1965, he returned to the Colts and played for one more season.

After football
After retiring from football, Nutter moved to La Plata, Maryland and started a beverage distribution company in Waldorf, Maryland that he ran for more than 40 years.  The company was named Center Distributors after his football position.

Nutter's wife of 44 years, Carole, a devout Catholic, died in 1997.  Two days before her death, in a service that took place in his wife's hospital room, Nutter converted to Catholicism after being a lifelong Methodist.  They had four children and ten grandchildren.

Nutter died on April 12, 2008 of heart failure at Civista Medical Center in La Plata.

References

External links

1931 births
2008 deaths
American football offensive linemen
Baltimore Colts players
Eastern Conference Pro Bowl players
People from Summersville, West Virginia
Sportspeople from Huntington, West Virginia
Players of American football from West Virginia
Pittsburgh Steelers players
People from La Plata, Maryland
Converts to Roman Catholicism from Methodism
Methodists from West Virginia
20th-century Methodists
20th-century Roman Catholics
21st-century Roman Catholics
Catholics from West Virginia
Catholics from Maryland
Virginia Tech Hokies football players
Methodists from Maryland